Kościuszko's Monument is a pedestal and statue of Polish General Tadeusz Kościuszko at the United States Military Academy at West Point, New York.  Kościuszko designed the defenses of the West Point garrison from 1778–1780 during the height of the Revolutionary War, when George Washington considered West Point to be the most important military post in America. The pedestal and shaft of the monument was first proposed in 1825 by John Latrobe, and dedicated in 1828. The statue, designed by D. Borja, was later added in 1913.

Kosciuszko, having attended the Royal Knights School in Warsaw and audited classes at the Ecole Militaire, advocated the establishment of an American military school for officers, a subject on which he wrote Jefferson many times.  After Jefferson established the academy, General William Davie requested Kosciuszko write the manual, Manoeuvres of Horse Artillery, which became a textbook at the academy.

References

Monuments and memorials at West Point
1828 sculptures
1913 sculptures
Bronze sculptures in New York (state)
Statues in New York (state)
West Point
1828 establishments in New York (state)